The 2016 Channel One Cup was played between 15–18 December 2016. The Czech Republic, Finland, Sweden and Russia played a round-robin for a total of three games per team and six games in total. Five of the matches were played in the VTB Ice Palace in Moscow, Russia, and one match in the Helsingin jäähalli in Helsinki, Finland. The tournament was part of 2016–17 Euro Hockey Tour. Tournament was won by Sweden.

Standings

Games
All times are local.
Moscow – (Moscow Time – UTC+3) Helsingfors – (Central European Time – UTC+1)

References

Channel
Channel
Channel
Channel
Channel
Channel One Cup (ice hockey)
December 2016 sports events in Russia
2016 in Moscow
International sports competitions in Helsinki
2010s in Helsinki